Lindsay Spencer (born 12 November 1961) is an Australian swimmer. He competed in two events at the 1980 Summer Olympics.

References

External links
 

1961 births
Living people
Australian male breaststroke swimmers
Olympic swimmers of Australia
Swimmers at the 1980 Summer Olympics
Swimmers at the 1978 Commonwealth Games
Commonwealth Games bronze medallists for Australia
Commonwealth Games medallists in swimming
Place of birth missing (living people)
Medallists at the 1978 Commonwealth Games